Pann is the melodic mode used by the Tamil people in their music since the ancient times. The ancient pans over centuries evolved first into a pentatonic scale. But from the earliest times, Tamil Music is heptatonic and known as eḻisai (ஏழிசை).

Panns in literature
There are several references to music and Pants in the ancient pre-Sangam and Sangam literature starting from the earliest known work Tholkappiyam (500 BCE). Among Sangam literature, Mathuraikkanci refers to women singing sevvaḻi pain to invoke the mercy of God during childbirth. In Tolkappiyam, the five landscapes of the Sangam literature had each an associated Pann, each describing the mood of the song associated with that landscape. Among the numerous pans that find mention in the ancient Tamil literature are, Ambal Pann, which is suitable to be played on the flute, sevvaḻi pain on the Yaḻ (lute), Nottiram and Sevvaḻi expressing pathos, the captivating Kurinji pain and the invigorating Murudappann.

The Sangam landscape was classified into five regions to describe the mood of the poem and to describe the intangibles of human emotions. While describing life and romance, the poets employed the background of the natural landscape and used the pann specific to that landscape to provide the mood. The  (seaside) landscape, which is employed to convey the grief of separation of lovers had the associated sevvaḻi pann expressing pathos. Malaipatukatam mentions Viraliyar singing Kurinjipann when offering worship to the deities of the mountainous regions. It also refers to Virali singing Marudappann before singing the eulogies of kings. Malaippadukadam also refers to the people trying to overcome their fatigue by singing Marudappann after working in the fields. There is a very interesting reference to Pants and birds/insects in Perumpanarruppatai. It says that the beetles liked to listen to Kurinjipann played on Vilyaḻ thinking it to be the voice of its own kith and kin, while they hated to listen to Palaipann played on the flute. There are also references to the Panar taking delight in mastering the Naivalam pann.

Evolution of Panns

In the post-Sangam period, between the third and the fifth centuries CE, Tamil music evolved to a higher sophistication. Silappatikaram, written around the fifth century CE, describes music based on logical, systematic and scientific calculations in the arrangements of the dancers on the stage to represent the notes and panns. silappatikaram contains several chapters dedicated to music and dance, of which the most famous is the kanal vari which is a duet between the hero Kovalan and his lady-love Madavi. Cilappatikaram contains musical terminology such as, aḻaku and matthirai referring to the musical pitch and the smallest fraction of an audible sound distinguishable by the human ear. From these evolved the scales.

Development of scales
One of the first scales employed by the ancient Tamils was the Mullaippann, a pentatonic scale composed of the notes sa ri ga pa da equivalent to C, D, E, G and A in the western notations. These fully harmonic scales,  constitutes the raga Mohanam in the Carnatic music style.

Mullaippann further evolved into sempaalai, a scale based on seven notes by the addition of two more notes, ma and ni to the pentatonic scale. Sempaalai pann corresponds to the Carnatic raga Harikambhoji. The seven basic notes are then developed into twelve swaras corresponding to the twelve houses of the zodiac.

The ancient Tamils also derived new panns by the process of modal shift of tonic and by the process of reallocating the pitch and beat of the notes. Cilappatikaram has an example of this in the chapter Arangetrukadai, where the Pann Mercharupalai is changed to derive a new Pann. By the model shift of the tonic (பண்ணுப்பெயர்த்தல்) the ancient Tamils devised the seven major palais. Using the process of the cycle of fifth (called aaya palai) or the cycle of fourth, five semitones were developed. For example, if the cycle is started with kural (sa),  the fifth note will yield iLi (pa),  the sa-pa relationship. In the cycle of fourth, kural (sa) will give uḻai (ma), the sa-ma relationship. These five semitones were added to the original seven notes giving 12 notes of the ancient Tamil musical octave. Among the 12 notes, the flats were called kuRai (குறை) and the sharps were called nirai (நிறை).

The seven major palais or parent scales of the music of the ancient Tamils are: Sempalai (corresponding to the present Harikambhoji), Padumalai Palai (Natabhairavi), Sevvazhi Palai (Hanumatodi), Arum Palai (Sankarabharanam), Kodi Palai (Kharaharapriya), Vilari Palai (Hanumatodi), and Merchem Palai (Mechakalyani).

The four original panns of maruthappann, kurinchippann, sevvaḻi and sadari thus evolved into 103 panns with varying characterisations. In all of these PaNs, Uyir SurangaL (Jeevaswarams: Life Notes) exist. The life note of a PaN is embellished according to the notes that appear immediately before and after. This is called Alangaaram (Gamakkam). Taking into consideration all these special notes, PaN Isai is different from Karnatik Music. Karnatik Music as two variations of each of the variables; Ri, Ga, Ma, Dha and Ni. PaN Isai has 4 variations of each of the 5 variable. Plus the 2 constants; Sa and Pa, there are 22 variations of the 7 basic notes. The ancient name for Raagam is Niram. Melakarta was called Thaai Niram and Raagams born from there were call Say Niram. The ancient name for ThaaLam is PaaNi. For example, Rupaka Talam was PaaNi MoonDRoththu. Before Sa, Ri, Ga... Tamils used the 12 Tamil Vowels. Looking at a keyboard, they would've used the 5 KuRil (Short Sounds) for the black keys and the 7 NeDil (Long Sounds) for the white keys.

Some of the panns and their equivalent Carnatic ragas were:

 Panchamam – Ahiri
 Paḻam Panchuram -  Sankarabharanam
 Meharahkkurinchi -  Neelambari
 Pazhanthakka Ragam  - Arabhi
 Kurinchi -   Malahari
 Natta Ragam – Panthuvaraali
 Inthalam -  Nathanamakriya
 Thakkesi -  Kambhoji
 Kausikam -  Bhairavi
 Nattappadai – Gambhiranaattai
 GandharaPanchamam – Kedara Gowlai

Panns in Saivite hymns

After the Sangam period and during the occupation of the Tamil country by Kalabhras, Tamil music was dormant for a period of a few centuries. With the advent of the Saivite saints Manikkavacakar (100 AD), Sundarar (900 AD), Thirunavukkarasar and Thirugnana Sambanthar (7th century CE) who used the ancient panns in their hymns (Tevaram), Tamil music experienced a revival. Only through these Tirumurais, hymns by Seerkaazhi Muthuthaandavar, hymn by Marimutha Pillai, Arunagirinathar, Ramalinga Swamigal and the hymns of Vaishnavite Alvars we can still experience the ancient traditions of the Tamil panns.  Sambanthar used the following seven panns: nattapaadai,  Thakka ragam,  Paḻanthakka ragam, Thakkesi, Kurinji, Viyazhak kurinji, and Meharahakkurinji. Manikkavacagar used Mulai Pann (Mohana Raagam) for the majority of his Thiruvasagam and Thirukkovaiyar. There are a few of his hymns where he used Bowli, Megaragakkurinji and Kalyaani. Sundaramoorthi SwamigaL wise widely influenced by Thirunyaanasambandhar SwamigaL and Thirunaavukkarasar 'Appar' SwamigaL, who used PaN Koli quite often. In actual, only Thirunaavukkarasar SwamigaL sang the Dhehvaaram, which made-up the 4th, 5th and 6th ThirumuRaigaL. Thirunyaanasambandhar SwamigaL wrote the ThirukaDaikaapu, which makes up the 1st, 2nd and 3rd ThirumuRaigaL. Thiru Sundharamoorthi SwamigaL wrote the ThirupaaTTu, which makes up the 7th ThirumuRai. Thiru MaaNikkavaasagar's Thiruvaasagam and Thirukkohvaiyaar makes up the 8th ThirumuRai. There 12 ThirumuRais. Thirumoolar's Thirumandhiram is the 10th ThirumuRai and SekkiZHaar's Thiru ThoNDar PuraaNam, or Periya PuraaNam is the 12th ThirumuRai. The ThirumuRais are the Devotional works of Saivaism and the 14 SaathirangaL (Saathirais) are the philosophical works of Saivaism, with ThiruvaLuvar's ThirkkuRaL accepted as Neethi nool or Saathiram (Singular form of SaathirangaL).

See also
Ancient Tamil music

References

 
, translated from Tamil by E.Sa Visswanathan.

Tamil-language literature
Tamil